Say Africa is the seventh studio album by South African musician Vusi Mahlasela. The title song of the album "Say Africa" was originally written and performed by South African musician Dave Goldblum in 1997 and released on Dave's album Valley Road, however Dave receives little recognition for his work. The song was performed by Vusi Mahlasela at the opening of the 2010 FIFA World Cup, where Vusi gave full credit to Dave Goldblum for having written the song. However, the song is still publicly recognised as Vusi's own. 
The album was produced by Taj Mahal with the basic tracks were recorded in Dave Matthews' studio and completed in Johannesburg.  Mahlasela performs duets with Taj Mahal and Angelique Kidjo on the album.  Say Africa was released in South Africa in late 2010 and is scheduled for international release on 18 January 2011.

Track listing
 Say Africa
 Woza
 Re Yo Tshela Kae
 Conjecture of the Hour
 Umalume - Featuring JB Ntuli
 Mokalanyane
 In Anyway - Featuring Taj Mahal
 Ode to Lesego
 Vezubuhle
 Nak Upenda Africa - Featuring Angelique Kidjo
 Korodi
 Ba Kae?
 Naka Mokhura
 Ntate Mandela

References

Vusi Mahlasela albums
2010 albums